Nicholas Joseph "Mickey" Witek (December 19, 1915 – August 24, 1990) was an American professional baseball player. He played all or part of seven seasons in Major League Baseball during the 1940s for the New York Giants and  New York Yankees, primarily as a second baseman.

Witek started and ended his career with the Yankee organization, but played all but two of his 581 MLB games as a member of the National League Giants, as a second baseman, shortstop and third baseman. In 1943, as the Giants' regular second baseman, he appeared in 153 games, batting .314 (fifth in the NL), and amassing 195 hits (second in the league). He led the Senior Circuit in singles (172) and finished 12th in the National League Most Valuable Player voting.  Defensively, he led NL second basemen in fielding percentage in 1942, and although he topped the league's second basemen in errors with 31 in 1943, he also led the NL in putouts and assists that season.

In 1944–45 Witek's career was interrupted while he served in the United States Coast Guard during World War II. His playing time diminished with the Giants in 1946 as Buddy Blattner claimed the regular second base job, and Witek finished his major league career with one at bat for the 1949 Yankees, as a pinch hitter, singling against Mel Parnell of the Boston Red Sox. He played one more season in the minor leagues in 1950 before retiring.

References

External links

Major League Baseball second basemen
New York Giants (NL) players
New York Yankees players
Bassett Furnituremakers players
Norfolk Tars players
Binghamton Triplets players
Newark Bears (IL) players
Jersey City Giants players
Louisville Colonels (minor league) players
Kansas City Blues (baseball) players
Seattle Rainiers players
Baseball players from Pennsylvania
People from Luzerne County, Pennsylvania
1915 births
1990 deaths
International League MVP award winners
United States Coast Guard personnel of World War II